Henrik Dahl (born 20 February 1960 in Vejlby-Risskov) is a Danish author and politician, who is a member of the Folketing for the Liberal Alliance. He was elected into parliament at the 2015 Danish general election.

Dahl first ran for parliament in the 2015 general election, where he was elected with 2,902	votes cast for him. He was reelected in the 2019 election with 1,737 votes.

In Denmark, his book from 1997, Hvis din nabo var en bil (If your neighbor was a car), has been considered a cultural sociological masterpiece.

Bibliography
Sandheden kort - Christiansborg fra A til Å (People's Press, 2018, co-author)
NT (People's Press, 2013)
Spildte kræfter (Gyldendal, 2011)
Den usynlige verden (Gyldendal, 2008)
Krigeren, borgeren og taberen (Gyldendal, 2006, co-author)
Mindernes land (Gyldendal, 2005)
Epostler (Gyldendal, 2003, co-author)
Det ny systemskifte (Gyldendal, co-author)
Borgerlige ord efter revolutionen (Gyldendal, 1999, co-author)
Den kronologiske uskyld (Gyldendal, 1998)
Hvis din nabo var en bil (Akademisk Forlag, 1997)
Marketing og semiotik (Akademisk Forlag, 1993, co-author)

External links 
 Biography on the website of the Danish Parliament (Folketinget)

References 

Living people
1960 births
People from Aarhus Municipality
Danish writers
Liberal Alliance (Denmark) politicians
Members of the Folketing 2015–2019
Members of the Folketing 2019–2022
Members of the Folketing 2022–2026